The Internet in Croatia became a reality in November 1992 when the first international connection linking  Zagreb and Vienna became operational.

By 2016 an estimated 74.2% of the Croatian population was using the Internet from home, work, and school as well as from their mobile phones. Internet has recently become widely accessible throughout Croatia. Good internet coverage is predominantly obtained within the urban areas of Croatia. Mobile internet speed averages around 65 megabytes per second, while router internet speed averages 46 megabytes per second.

Facts and figures

 Top-level domain: .hr, administered by the Croatian Academic and Research Network (CARNET).
 Internet users: 
 3.17 million users (2016).
 2.8 million users, 80th in the world; 63.0% of the population, 59th in the world (2012);
 2.2 million users (2009).
 1.7 million Facebook users (2016).
 769,317 households (50.6%; 2011)
 Fixed broadband: 909,090 subscriptions, 58th in the world; 20.3% of the population, 48th in the world (2012).
 Wireless broadband: 2.3 million subscribers, 60th in the world; 52.3% of the population, 26th in the world (2012).
 Internet hosts: 729,420 hosts, 50th in the world (2012).
 IPv4: 2.0 million addresses allocated, less than 0.05% of the world total, 455.9 addresses per 1000 people (2012).
 Total volume of Internet traffic: 160 petabytes (Q2 2016)

History

The first international Internet connection was established on 17 November 1992, between CARNET in Zagreb and the University of Vienna, with a speed of 64kbps, and a bandwidth of 9600 bit/s.

The .hr domain was first registered in March 1993.

Technologies and services

Digital Subscriber Line (DSL) 

In Croatia ADSL was introduced in 2000 by the German owned operator T-Com, formerly HT (Hrvatski telekom, meaning Croatian telecom). DSL is the most common form of broadband. Flat-rate based plans are the most commonly used in conjunction with DSL. There are companies offering ADSL2+ Internet Access and TriplePlay. Local loops were expected to be unbundled after September 2006. , this has only partially been done. ADSL and fixed line phones use the same cable plant in most parts of the country, in some locations the line quality is not good enough to support a stable ADSL link, and in some locations there is no ADSL supporting telephone switch installed.

The list of DSL providers in Croatia is:
 Hrvatski Telekom (owned by Deutsche Telekom) - MAXadsl, with a TriplePlay plan MaxTV, nationwide
 Iskon Internet (owned by HT) - part of the network is locally based (in major urban areas), and partly services are run by local loop over T-Com copper lines, TriplePlay plan Iskon.TV, but only on the local part of the network for now.
 Vipnet d.o.o. (owned by A1 Telekom Austria Group)
 Optima Telekom d.d. - part of the network is locally based (in major urban areas), and partly services are run by local loop over T-Com copper lines, TriplePlay plan is called OptiTV. The reach for TriplePlay is extended gradually.
Transintercom d.o.o.
Magic Telekom d.o.o.
H1 telekom d.d.

WiMax 

The oldest commercial WiMax provider is: Novi net d.o.o.

WIMAX concessions were also given to Optima Telekom, WIMAX Telecom and Odašiljači i veze d.d. (OiV). However, none of them has to the present day realized the full potential of their concession, due to the high cost of the infrastructure which needs to be built. Also, the providers claim that there are not yet enough potential interested users for this technology.

Fiber to the Home (FTTH) 

The existing Fiber to the Home provider, Metronet telekomunikacije d.d. T-Com, is performing a trial that is expected to take a few years time, to see the potential for nationwide coverage using FTTH technology. In mid-2009 a 28 floor building in Rijeka was equipped with FTTH providing triple play as a test site. Supposedly in three further cities similar test are being run.

Cable Internet 

Cable Internet is available, but it is not as widespread as ADSL. There is one Cable Internet provider in Croatia, A1 Hrvatska d.o.o., also with a TriplePlay offer.

Mobile broadband 

Mobile broadband Internet access is offered by the three national concession GSM operators:
T-Mobile Croatia,
VIPnet (Vodafone partner), and
Tele2 Croatia.

There are both pre-paid and post-paid plans. All three providers cooperate with CARNET to provide a discount for users in the academic and education community - ordered by seniority they are named Mobile CARNET/VipmeCARNET (VIPnet), Tele2CARNET (Tele2 Croatia), Stick2CARNET (T-Mobile HR).

It is not mandatory to register any personal data upon purchasing a prepaid plan (together with the USB based mobile modem stick), so any foreign citizen may also get it for in-land use.

GSM coverage is very good, while EDGE and UMTS coverage is rather sparse,  and the usage for higher speeds is only possible on certain, mainly urban locations and in the Adriatic Sea area.

National research and education network 

CARNET is the national research and education network and a significant Internet provider for numerous end-users in the academic and educational community in Croatia.

Dial-up Internet 

The dial-up Internet penetration in Croatia is still high, mainly in rural areas.
This is due to the high penetration rate for fixed line telephones throughout country. There are several providers which also offer this rather old connection method:
 T-Com Croatia - dial-up plans exist
 Iskon Internet - the Iskon.Dial-Up service enables classic dial-up access, with several plans.
 VIPnet - their Homebox + offer includes which they designate as "fixed line", but technically uses GSM has the plan which also offers Internet access. Also, the VIP online plan exists using classic modem lines.
 Optima Telekom - OptiNET Dial-Up service
 Globalnet - dial-up unified login data, also possible for usage by foreigners
 There are also some smaller dial-up providers.

Wireless LAN hotspots 

Some Wireless LAN (WLAN) hotspots exist in Internet cafés and some cities.

There are also many volunteer-driven WLAN local-city networks,
for example:
 DJWireless (Đakovo),
 OSWirless (Osijek),
 TENG (Nova Gradiška), and
 some others.
They usually serve a small number of local users.
VIPnet and Iskon Internet operate some hotspots commercially.

Satellite Internet 

In the past, there were a few resellers of one-way satellite Internet services, which mostly ceased to exist with the arrival of increased ADSL coverage and reduced interest in the service. Currently (as of 2010), there is at least one reseller of a two-way satellite Internet service. However, this method of Internet access is not economically viable, except for a very few very remote areas. The equipment needed is not subsidized, unlike ADSL and FTTH trial equipment.

When Croatia joined the European Union in the year 2013, it became an integral part of the agenda to close the digital divide. According to official data, satellite Internet coverage at the end of 2013 was 94%.

Commercial fiber 

In Croatia there are various commercial fiber providers. Some of them:
 Omonia

Internet censorship and surveillance

There is no OpenNet Initiative country profile for Croatia, but it is shown as little or no evidence of Internet filtering in all areas (political, social, conflict/security, and Internet tools) on the ONI global Internet filtering maps.

The constitution and law generally provide for freedom of speech and the press; however, growing economic pressures lead journalists to practice self-censorship. Hate speech committed over the Internet is punishable by six months' to three years' imprisonment and libel is a criminal offense but the law is not enforced and social media,forums and reader's comment section on news portals are full of hate speech directed towards ethnic minorities and members of the LGBTQ community. There are no government restrictions on access to the Internet or reports the government monitors e-mail or Internet chat rooms. In general individuals and groups engage in the peaceful expression of views via the Internet, including by e-mail. Internet access is widely available and used by citizens throughout the country.

See also 

 Telecommunications in Croatia
 Media of Croatia

References

External links 
 Broadband for all, The Digital Agenda for Europe official information page, including Croatia

 
Croatia